Millstadt is the name of a village and a township in St. Clair County, Illinois, in the United States:

 Millstadt, Illinois
 Millstadt Township, St. Clair County, Illinois

See also
 Millstatt